Yongxiu railway station is a railway station located in Yongxiu County of Jiujiang, in Jiangxi province, eastern China.

It serves the Beijing–Kowloon railway and Nanchang–Jiujiang intercity railway.

Jiujiang
Railway stations in Jiangxi
Stations on the Beijing–Kowloon Railway